Bird is the second studio album by B.A.L.L., released in 1988 by Shimmy Disc.

Track listing

Personnel 
Adapted from the Bird liner notes.

B.A.L.L.
 Don Fleming – vocals, guitar
 Kramer – bass guitar, organ, production, engineering
 David Licht – drums
 Jay Spiegel – drums

Production and additional personnel
 Michael Macioce – photography
 Sheena – design

Release history

References

External links 
 

1988 albums
Albums produced by Kramer (musician)
B.A.L.L. albums
Shimmy Disc albums